The Vermont Lumberjacks are a USA Hockey-sanctioned Tier III Junior A ice hockey organization from Burlington, Vermont.

The players, ages 16–20, carry amateur status under Junior A guidelines and hope to earn a spot on higher levels of junior hockey in the United States and Canada, Canadian Major Junior, Collegiate, and eventually professional teams.

History
In 2003, the Washington Jr. Nationals from Arlington, Virginia, became a charter member of the new Tier III Junior A Atlantic Junior Hockey League (AJHL). They originally played at the Bowie Ice Arena in Bowie, Maryland, from 2003 to 2005 before moving splitting time with The Gardens Ice House in Laurel, Maryland, in 2006. With the opening of the new Washington Capitals practice facility at the 1,200-seat Kettler Capitals Iceplex, the Jr. Nationals moved across the Potomac River, splitting time between The Gardens Ice House and their new venue in 2006–07 until becoming full-time tenants in Arlington for the 2007–08 season. The team moved back to The Gardens Ice House in 2010. The team also played single games at the Ashburn Ice House in the 2008–09 and 2009–10 season as a way to reach out to area youth hockey organizations.

In 2013, Tier III junior hockey went through a large reorganization that led to the dissolution of the Eastern Junior Hockey League (EJHL) and six former EJHL teams joining the AJHL. The AJHL was then re-branded as the Eastern Hockey League (EHL).

Following the 2013–14 season, the Jr. Nationals were relocated to Burlington, Vermont, and renamed the Vermont Lumberjacks, bringing junior hockey back to the state of Vermont two years after the Green Mountain Glades departed following the 2011–12 season.

In 2015, the EHL added a lower level Tier III division (formerly called Tier III Junior B by USA Hockey) called the EHL-Elite Division. This led to the current EHL teams to be placed in the EHL-Premier Division and the Lumberjacks moving their Junior B team from the Metropolitan Junior Hockey League to the Elite Division. In 2017, the EHL re-branded its divisions, dropping the Premier name from their top division and renamed the Elite Division to Premier.

Due to the COVID-19 pandemic, the Lumberjacks relocated halfway through the 2020–21 season to have home games at Waterville Valley Ice Arena in Waterville Valley, New Hampshire, as the Lumberjacks Hockey Club.

Season-by-season records

Alumni
The Jr. Nationals/Lumberjacks have produced a number of alumni playing in higher levels of junior hockey, NCAA Division I, Division III, ACHA college and professional programs.
David Bondra – Played with HK Poprad of the Slovak Extraliga.
Nikita Kashirsky – Played with the HC Spartak Moscow of the Kontinental Hockey League.
Jarred Tinordi (Montreal Canadiens, 1st round draft pick) – Has played in the NHL with the Canadiens and Arizona Coyotes. Currently under contract with the Nashville Predators.

References

External links
 Official Lumberjacks web site
 Official League Website

Ice hockey teams in Vermont
Sports in Burlington, Vermont
Junior ice hockey teams in the United States